Waldwick is a borough in Bergen County, in the U.S. state of New Jersey. As of the 2020 United States census, the borough's population was 10,058, an increase of 433 (+4.5%) from the 2010 census count of 9,625, which in turn reflected an increase of three people (+0.0%) from the 9,622 counted in the 2000 census.

History
Originally inhabited during the pre-Columbian era by the Lenape Native American tribe, the region surrounding Waldwick was first explored by Europeans when a Dutch trading expedition landed near there in 1610. With the creation of the Nieuw Amsterdam colony in 1624, the present site of the borough  became a Dutch possession along with the rest of northeastern New Jersey. During the period from 1624 to 1664 it was sparsely developed by Dutch settlers, mainly for agricultural purposes. With the annexation of Nieuw Amsterdam by the English in 1664 came a nearly instant increase in immigration to the region and the development of several settlements in and around the present borders of the borough.

In the mid-19th century, Waldwick and the surrounding area constituted a small settlement within Franklin Township, an area that encompassed much of northwestern Bergen County.  The area's population grew significantly after the Erie Railroad established a train station. On January 1, 1886, Orvil Township was formed from portions of Hohokus Township and Washington Township. The "Boroughitis" phenomenon that swept through Bergen County, in which 26 boroughs were formed in the county in 1894 alone, hit Orvil Township particularly hard, resulting in the formation of five new boroughs created from the nascent township, including Montvale and Woodcliff (now Woodcliff Lake) on August 31, 1894, Allendale on November 10, 1894, Saddle River on November 20, 1894, and Upper Saddle River formed on November 22, 1894. On April 7, 1919, a council of citizens voted to incorporate as the borough of "Waldwick", from the remaining portions of Orvil Township. With the creation of the borough of Waldwick, Orvil Township was dissolved.

Various derivations of the borough's name have been offered, including one that "Waldwick" is Old English, from "wald" (forest) and "wick" (settlement or place). According to The History of Bergen County written in 1900 by James M. Van Valen, the name Waldwick comes from a Saxon language word meaning "beautiful grove" though other sources show a related meaning of "village in a grove".

Historic places 
Waldwick is home to the following historic places listed on the National Register of Historic Places:

 Erie Railroad Signal Tower, Waldwick Yard – Northeast end of Bonhert Place, west side of railroad tracks (listed 1983). Built in 1848 for the Erie Railroad.
 Albert Smith House – 289 Wyckoff Avenue, built in 1750
 Waldwick Railroad Station – Hewson Avenue and Prospect Streets (listed 1978). The station opened in 1886 as a station along the Erie Railroad.
 White Tenant House – 16 White's Lane (listed 1983, now demolished)

Geography
According to the United States Census Bureau, the borough had a total area of 2.07 square miles (5.35 km2), including 2.05 square miles (5.30 km2) of land and 0.02 square miles (0.05 km2) of water (0.97%).

The borough is surrounded by the Bergen County municipalities of Allendale, Ho-Ho-Kus, Midland Park, Ridgewood, Saddle River and Wyckoff.

The Ho-Ho-Kus Brook flows through the center of the borough in a roughly southward direction.

Demographics

2010 census

The Census Bureau's 2006–2010 American Community Survey showed that (in 2010 inflation-adjusted dollars) median household income was $95,774 (with a margin of error of +/− $7,836) and the median family income was $104,335 (+/− $12,466). Males had a median income of $66,838 (+/− $8,541) versus $57,137 (+/− $6,800) for females. The per capita income for the borough was $41,689 (+/− $3,047). About 2.8% of families and 3.5% of the population were below the poverty line, including 5.2% of those under age 18 and 5.1% of those age 65 or over.

Same-sex couples headed 16 households in 2010, an increase from the 10 counted in 2000.

2000 census
As of the 2000 United States census there were 9,622 people, 3,428 households, and 2,677 families residing in the borough. The population density was 4,616.2 people per square mile (1,786.1/km2). There were 3,495 housing units at an average density of 1,676.8 per square mile (648.8/km2). The racial makeup of the borough was 92.68% White, 0.59% African American, 0.04% Native American, 4.52% Asian, 1.31% from other races, and 0.85% from two or more races. Hispanic or Latino of any race were 5.31% of the population.

There were 3,428 households, out of which 36.3% had children under the age of 18 living with them, 67.5% were married couples living together, 7.8% had a female householder with no husband present, and 21.9% were non-families. 18.7% of all households were made up of individuals, and 10.6% had someone living alone who was 65 years of age or older. The average household size was 2.81 and the average family size was 3.22.

In the borough the population was spread out, with 25.5% under the age of 18, 5.3% from 18 to 24, 31.5% from 25 to 44, 22.5% from 45 to 64, and 15.2% who were 65 years of age or older. The median age was 38 years. For every 100 females, there were 94.8 males. For every 100 females age 18 and over, there were 92.0 males.

The median income for a household in the borough was $75,532, and the median income for a family was $82,208. Males had a median income of $60,671 versus $37,145 for females. The per capita income for the borough was $30,733. About 1.3% of families and 2.1% of the population were below the poverty line, including 1.7% of those under age 18 and 3.0% of those age 65 or over.

Government

Local government
Waldwick is governed under the Borough form of New Jersey municipal government, which is used in 218 municipalities (of the 564) statewide, making it the most common form of government in New Jersey. The governing body is comprised of a Mayor and a Borough Council, with all positions elected at-large on a partisan basis as part of the November general election. A Mayor is elected directly by the voters to a four-year term of office. The Borough Council is comprised of six members elected to serve three-year terms on a staggered basis, with two seats coming up for election each year in a three-year cycle. The Borough form of government used by Waldwick is a "weak mayor / strong council" government in which council members act as the legislative body with the mayor presiding at meetings and voting only in the event of a tie. The mayor can veto ordinances subject to an override by a two-thirds majority vote of the council. The mayor makes committee and liaison assignments for council members, and most appointments are made by the mayor with the advice and consent of the council.

, the Mayor of Waldwick is Republican Thomas A. Giordano, whose term of office ends December 31, 2023. Members of the Borough Council (with party affiliation and term-end year listed in parentheses) are Council President Paul Schatz (R, 2023), Kathleen E. Cericola (R, 2024), Michael F. Ritchie Jr. (R, 2024), Don Sciolaro (R, 2025), Theresa Sherman (R, 2023) and Michele S. Weber (R, 2025).

Federal, state and county representation
Waldwick is located in the 5th Congressional District and is part of New Jersey's 40th state legislative district. Prior to the 2011 reapportionment following the 2010 Census, Waldwick had been in the 39th state legislative district.

Politics
As of March 2011, there were a total of 6,277 registered voters in Waldwick, of which 1,429 (22.8% vs. 31.7% countywide) were registered as Democrats, 1,617 (25.8% vs. 21.1%) were registered as Republicans and 3,227 (51.4% vs. 47.1%) were registered as Unaffiliated. There were 4 voters registered as Libertarians or Greens. Among the borough's 2010 Census population, 65.2% (vs. 57.1% in Bergen County) were registered to vote, including 87.2% of those ages 18 and over (vs. 73.7% countywide).

In the 2016 presidential election, Republican Donald Trump received 2,746 votes (51.9% vs. 41.1% countywide), ahead of Democrat Hillary Clinton with 2,311 votes (43.6% vs. 54.2%) and other candidates with 239 votes (4.5% vs. 4.6%), among the 5,357 ballots cast by the borough's 6,880 registered voters, for a turnout of 77.9% (vs. 72.5% in Bergen County). In the 2012 presidential election, Republican Mitt Romney received 2,606 votes (53.6% vs. 43.5% countywide), ahead of Democrat Barack Obama with 2,169 votes (44.6% vs. 54.8%) and other candidates with 50 votes (1.0% vs. 0.9%), among the 4,861 ballots cast by the borough's 6,543 registered voters, for a turnout of 74.3% (vs. 70.4% in Bergen County). In the 2008 presidential election, Republican John McCain received 2,800 votes (53.4% vs. 44.5% countywide), ahead of Democrat Barack Obama with 2,353 votes (44.9% vs. 53.9%) and other candidates with 51 votes (1.0% vs. 0.8%), among the 5,239 ballots cast by the borough's 6,529 registered voters, for a turnout of 80.2% (vs. 76.8% in Bergen County). In the 2004 presidential election, Republican George W. Bush received 2,891 votes (56.9% vs. 47.2% countywide), ahead of Democrat John Kerry with 2,141 votes (42.1% vs. 51.7%) and other candidates with 33 votes (0.6% vs. 0.7%), among the 5,084 ballots cast by the borough's 6,281 registered voters, for a turnout of 80.9% (vs. 76.9% in the whole county).

In the 2013 gubernatorial election, Republican Chris Christie received 65.7% of the vote (2,018 cast), ahead of Democrat Barbara Buono with 32.9% (1,010 votes), and other candidates with 1.4% (42 votes), among the 3,110 ballots cast by the borough's 6,356 registered voters (40 ballots were spoiled), for a turnout of 48.9%. In the 2009 gubernatorial election, Republican Chris Christie received 1,883 votes (53.6% vs. 45.8% countywide), ahead of Democrat Jon Corzine with 1,376 votes (39.1% vs. 48.0%), Independent Chris Daggett with 208 votes (5.9% vs. 4.7%) and other candidates with 21 votes (0.6% vs. 0.5%), among the 3,515 ballots cast by the borough's 6,404 registered voters, yielding a 54.9% turnout (vs. 50.0% in the county).

Education
Students in pre-kindergarten through twelfth grade are educated in the Waldwick Public School District. As of the 2020–21 school year, the district, comprised of four schools, had an enrollment of 1,630 students and 141.3 classroom teachers (on an FTE basis), for a student–teacher ratio of 11.5:1. Schools in the district (with 2020–21 enrollment data from the National Center for Education Statistics) are 
Crescent School with 344 students in grades K–5, 
Julia A. Traphagen School with 425 students in grades Pre-K–5, 
Waldwick Middle School with 367 students in grades 6–8 and 
Waldwick High School with 460 students in grades 9–12.

During the 2009–10 school year, Julia A. Traphagen School was awarded the Blue Ribbon School Award of Excellence by the United States Department of Education, the highest award an American school can receive. It was the only school in Bergen County that year out of ten schools honored statewide and the first Bergen County elementary school to receive the honor in six years.

Public school students from the borough, and all of Bergen County, are eligible to attend the secondary education programs offered by the Bergen County Technical Schools, which include the Bergen County Academies in Hackensack, and the Bergen Tech campus in Teterboro or Paramus. The district offers programs on a shared-time or full-time basis, with admission based on a selective application process and tuition covered by the student's home school district.

In addition, Waldwick is home of the Waldwick Seventh-day Adventist School; The Village School, a Montessori school for children though 8th grade; and The Forum School, which is an alternative school established in 1954 for students who are developmentally disabled. Pre-school programs are also offered at Rainbow Corners day school, at the Methodist Church, Building Blocks Child Center at Christ Community Church (across from the high school), Building Blocks and at Saddle Acres School.

Transportation

Roads and highways

Roadways travelling through Waldwick include Route 17, County Route 502 and County Route 507.

Public transportation

Waldwick is served by NJ Transit at the Waldwick train station, located at the intersection of West Prospect Street, Lafayette Place and Hewson Avenue. The station is served by both the Bergen County Line and Main Line, which run north–south to Hoboken Terminal with connections via the Secaucus Junction transfer station to New York Penn Station and to other NJ Transit rail service. Connections are available at the Hoboken Terminal to other NJ Transit rail lines, the PATH train at the Hoboken PATH station, New York Waterways ferry service to the World Financial Center and other destinations along with Hudson-Bergen Light Rail service.

Bus service between Waldwick and the Port Authority Bus Terminal in Midtown Manhattan is available via Short Line.

Awards

Safest Small Town in America
In 2017, Waldwick was ranked the "Safest Small Town in America". This title was awarded based on 2015 FBI crime statistic data on the number of violent crimes per 1,000 residents. The rankings were done by LendEDU, a company known for its studies. By their definition, a small town has a population of over 5,000 yet under 10,000. At the time of the ranking, Waldwick had 9,997 residents.

Notable people

People who were born in, residents of, or otherwise closely associated with Waldwick include:
 Jim Alexander (born 1935), documentary photographer, photojournalist and activist
 Enzo Amore (born 1986), professional wrestler formerly under contract with WWE
 Martha Byrne (born 1969), actress who performed on Broadway as a child in Annie and as an adult in the role of Lily Walsh in As the World Turns
 Jay Dittamo (born 1959), drummer, percussionist and music producer
 Warren Farrell (born 1943), educator, gender equality activist and author
 Dave Fiore (born 1974), former pro football player
 Joe Harasymiak (born 1986), head coach for the Maine Black Bears football team
 Frank Herbert (1931–2018), former member of the New Jersey Senate and the Bergen County Board of Chosen Freeholders whose first elective race was a loss running for the Waldwick Borough Council
 Jack Hewson (1924–2012), professional basketball player who played for the Boston Celtics during the 1947–1948 season
 Charles Kinsey (1773–1849), Congressman
 Jerry Palmieri (born 1958), football strength and conditioning coach, most recently on Tom Coughlin's staff for the New York Giants  
 Brunilda Ruiz (1936–2019), ballet dancer with the Joffrey Ballet
 Allison Smith (born 1969), actress

References

Sources 

 Municipal Incorporations of the State of New Jersey (according to Counties) prepared by the Division of Local Government, Department of the Treasury (New Jersey); December 1, 1958.
 Clayton, W. Woodford; and Nelson, William. History of Bergen and Passaic Counties, New Jersey, with Biographical Sketches of Many of its Pioneers and Prominent Men., Philadelphia: Everts and Peck, 1882.
 Harvey, Cornelius Burnham (ed.), Genealogical History of Hudson and Bergen Counties, New Jersey. New York: New Jersey Genealogical Publishing Co., 1900.
 Van Valen, James M. History of Bergen County, New Jersey. New York: New Jersey Publishing and Engraving Co., 1900.
 Westervelt, Frances A. (Frances Augusta), 1858–1942, History of Bergen County, New Jersey, 1630–1923, Lewis Historical Publishing Company, 1923.

External links

 Official website
 Waldwick Public Library
 Waldwick Public School District
 
 School Data for the Waldwick Public School District, National Center for Education Statistics

 
1919 establishments in New Jersey
Borough form of New Jersey government
Boroughs in Bergen County, New Jersey
Populated places established in 1919